Finger Mountain is a topographical formation in interior Alaska. Not actually a mountain, it is a wide broad hill, with an altitude of around 2202 ft. It is named for Finger Rock, a distinctive granite protrusion on its surface. Finger Mountain Wayside is a partially maintained pullout along the Dalton Highway at mile 97.5. It features informational signs and some facilities for travelers

Notes

Hills of Alaska
Landforms of Yukon–Koyukuk Census Area, Alaska